Au Sable Township is the name of some places in the U.S. state of Michigan:

 Au Sable Township, Iosco County, Michigan
 Au Sable Township, Roscommon County, Michigan

Michigan township disambiguation pages